The NPSL Golden Gate Conference is a division within the National Premier Soccer League it consists of teams from Northern California

Teams
Academica SC
El Farolito
FC Davis
Napa Valley 1839 FC
Project 51O
Sacramento Gold
Sonoma County Sol

Champions
2014: Sacramento Gold
2015: Sonoma County Sol
2016: Sonoma County Sol
2017: CD Aguiluchos USA
2018: El Farolito
2019: FC Davis
2020 Season Cancelled

References

Soccer clubs in California